The 1976 UEFA European Football Championship final tournament was held in Yugoslavia. This was the fifth UEFA European Championship, held every four years and endorsed by UEFA. The final tournament took place between 16 and 20 June 1976.

Only four countries played in the final tournament, with the tournament consisting of the semi-finals, a third place play-off, and the final. This was the last tournament to have this format, as the tournament was expanded to include eight teams four years later. It was the only time that all four matches in the final tournament were decided after extra time, either on penalties or by goals scored. This was also the last tournament in which the hosts had to qualify for the final stage.

Czechoslovakia won the tournament after defeating holders West Germany in the final on penalties following a 2–2 draw after extra time. Antonín Panenka gained fame for his delicately chipped penalty which won the tournament for Czechoslovakia, the country's only European Championship title.

Qualification

The qualifying round was played throughout 1974 and 1975 (group phase) and 1976 (quarter-finals). There were eight qualifying groups of four teams each. The matches were played in a home-and-away basis. Victories were worth two points, draws one point, and defeats no points. Only group winners could qualify for the quarter-finals. The quarter-finals were played in two legs on a home-and-away basis. The winners of the quarter-finals would go through, to the final tournament. This was the first time the Soviet Union did not qualify for the finals tournament.

Qualified teams

Venues

Squads

Match officials

Final tournament

At the final tournament, extra time and a penalty shoot-out were used to decide the winner if necessary.

All times are local, CET (UTC+1).

Bracket

Semi-finals

Third place play-off

Final

Statistics

Goalscorers

Awards
UEFA Team of the Tournament

References

Bibliography

External links

 UEFA Euro 1976 at UEFA.com

 
1976
1975–76 in European football
1975–76 in Yugoslav football
1976
June 1976 sports events in Europe